The Ministry of Civil Services is the governmental body in the Sultanate of Oman responsible for all matters relating to government employees under the civil service system.

The current Minister of Civil Service is Khalid bin Omar Al Marhoon. The Undersecretary of the Ministry of Civil Service For Civil Service Affairs is Abdulrahman bin Ibrahim Al Abri and the Undersecretary of the Ministry of Civil Service for Administrative Development Affairs is Salim bin Mussalam Al Busaidi.

Function 
The competences of the Ministry of Civil Service is as follows:
Suggesting policies and strategies for the development of governmental bodies in relation to organizational and human resources matters.
Supporting the Council of Civil Service.
Making legislation suggestions in the field civil service.
Setting the principles and standards for implementing the employment plans in regard to civil service.
Issuing opinions in regard to the complaints and queries made by civil service employees to the ministry.
Carrying out field visits and follow up works to ensure the compliance of civil service laws.
Coordinating with governmental bodies in relation to the security clearance of employees.
Implementing the strategy relating to central employment of governmental employees.
Implementing the strategy relating to the Omanization of governmental jobs.
Following up the strategies and programs for training governmental employees.
Approving organizational structures of other governmental bodies.
Carrying out budget researches in regard to employment and compensation.
Reviewing the annual employment budget of other governmental bodies.
Following up the implementation and development of the system for organizing positions in governmental bodies.
Operating the human resources system of governmental bodies.
Providing technical support for governmental bodies in all matters relating to civil service.

The competences of the Ministry of Civil Service do not extend to governmental bodies that are subject to a special law and not the civil service law.

References

External links 
 

Government of Oman